The 1976–77 Scottish Cup was the 92nd staging of Scotland's most prestigious football elimination competition. The Cup was won by Celtic who defeated Rangers in the final.

First round

Second round

Replays

Third round

Replays

Fourth round

Replays

Quarter-finals

Replays

Semi-finals

Final

See also

1976–77 in Scottish football
1976–77 Scottish League Cup

Scottish Cup seasons
1976–77 in Scottish football
Scot